Dixie Bibb Graves (1882–1965) was a U.S. Senator from Alabama from 1937 to 1938. Senator Graves may also refer to:

Azariah Graves (1768–1850), North Carolina State Senate
Charles H. Graves (1839–1928), Minnesota State Senate
Frank X. Graves Jr. (1923–1990), New Jersey State Senate
Paul D. Graves (1907–1972), New York State Senate
Rhoda Fox Graves (1877–1950), New York State Senate
Ross Graves (1874–1940), New York State Senate
Sam Graves (born 1963), Missouri State Senate
William Carey Graves (1895–1966), Texas State Senate